HonorHealth Scottsdale Osborn Medical Center is a private, non-profit acute-care teaching hospital in Scottsdale, Arizona.

History 
The hospital was founded in 1962. In 2021, the hospital opened the 250,000-square-foot Bob Bové Neuroscience Center.

Facilities 
The hospital is an American College of Surgeons-verified Level I trauma center, an Arizona Department of Health Services-certified cardiac arrest center, and a DNV-certified primary stroke center. The campus is also home to the 15,500 square foot HonorHealth Military Partnership Program training center.

References

External links 
 HonorHealth Scottsdale Osborn Medical Center

Hospitals in Arizona
Hospitals established in 1962
Scottsdale, Arizona
Trauma centers